"You Got the Love" is a song by British songwriting team The Source featuring American singer-songwriter Candi Staton. Originally released in 1986, the song was remixed and re-released in 1991, 1997, and 2006. It reached number three on the UK Singles Chart, number two on the UK Dance Singles Chart and number one on the UK Club Chart. 

The song has been covered by other artists, including a version by English indie rock band Florence and the Machine in 2009, which reached number five on the UK chart. The Now Voyager Remix of the song was used for the theme tune of live Football League coverage on Sky Sports until the start of the 2014–15 season.

Background and release

The original version is a soul/disco/gospel track, written by Anthony B. Stephens, Arnecia Michelle Harris and John Bellamy. British DJ Simon Harris was the first person to discover and license the song in 1986 when he was looking for tracks to release on his newly formed Music of Life label with DJ Froggy, Harris then took the track to Morgan Khan, the distributor of the new label, the track was licensed and released on Khan's StreetSounds Streetwave label. The original Candi Staton track had been recorded for a direct-to-video 1980s documentary about an obese man who was trying to lose weight. Staton said she couldn't remember having recorded a song called "You Got the Love". It was only later that she realised she had performed the song years earlier for the documentary. The producers of the video had selected the song for her to sing, but as they had no funds to pay her, they donated half of the copyright and publishing to Staton. It featured an a cappella version utilised by Paul Simpson for a remix of the Adeva song "Musical Freedom" in 1989.

The Candi Staton a cappella was originally mixed over an instrumental version of the Frankie Knuckles/Jamie Principle house song "Your Love". This bootleg release was a studio recording of Eren Abdullah mixing the two pieces of vinyl together. The DJ Eren "Original Bootleg" mix was released by John Truelove's record label in 1991 and reached number four in the UK Singles Chart. It was re-issued in 1997 by React Music Limited in a new remixed version called the "Now Voyager Mix". This time the record reached number three, the song's highest position, and then was remixed again in 2006 with new mixes by the Shapeshifters amongst others. This time the rights to the record were picked up by EMI's Positiva label (also the label the Shapeshifters were signed to), who scored another top ten hit, when the track reached number seven. The 2006 mix also featured more lyrics than the first two versions.

The "Original Bootleg Radio Mix" of the track was featured in the film Layer Cake in the club where Sidney talks to the film's protagonist as he looks on at Sidney's girlfriend. The "Now Voyager Mix" (released in 1997) was used on the series finale of the HBO comedy dramedy series Sex and the City.

Critical reception
Alan Jones from Music Week wrote in 1997, "A brilliant marriage of two different records, the Source featuring Candi Staton's "You Got The Love" was a truly inspired amalgam, well deserving its top five status in 1991. Six years on, it has been extensively remixed by the Rhythm Masters and David Morales & Frankie Knuckles. The new mixes work well, although the 1991 mixes remain the best. Well worth another outing." James Hyman from the RM Dance Update rated the 1997 remix five out of five, adding, "Now 'Voyager's Epic' (which is managing to gain considerable airplay) borrows from Elgar's 'Enigma Variations' and, with the vocal, creates a parallel to Massive Attack's 'Unfinished Sympathy' via an uplifting and spinetingling surge."

Music video
The planned 1986 video was supposed to feature a  man wanting to lose weight.

The 1991 video shows silhouettes of men and women dancing on a white background, sometimes as individuals, couples or in groups, intercut with a sequence of close-ups of different faces miming to the lyrics. Grainy footage of a Northern line London Underground train entering a station also appears.

The 1997 video features the "Now Voyager mix" and portrays a man dressed like a friar carrying a cross being guided by an angel and tempted by the Devil.

The 2006 version features the "New Voyager mix" in a black and white video. Set in London, it portrays an angelic young man (played by broadcaster Gary Newbon's son Neil) watching over the poor, lonely and vulnerable in the streets, subways and gardens. (Referencing the Wim Wenders film Wings of Desire)

Impact and legacy
Mixmag ranked the song number 33 in its "100 Greatest Dance Singles of All Time" list in 1996, adding:

English house music DJ, DJ Paulette named the song as one of her favourites in 1996, saying, "This is one of my desert island discs. It came out in about 1991/1992 and it's just fantastic, so strong. I remember the video being shown on TOTP, it charted really highly. The energy of the track is inspirational."

Time Out listed the song number seven in their "The 100 best party songs" list in 2018, adding,

Accolades

(*) indicates the list is not in any particular order.

Track listings

 1986 original version
A1. "You Got the Love"  — 4:27
A2. "You Got the Love"  — 6:45
B1. "You Got the Love"  — 7:07
B2. "You Got the Love"  — 8:07

 1989 version
"Untitled (You Got the Love / Your Love)"

 1991 version
"You Got the Love" 
"You Got the Love" 
"You Got the Love" 
"You Got the Love" 
"You Got the Love" 
"You Got the Love" 

 1991 Trax USA version
"Frankie Knuckles – Your Love / You Got The Love (Remix)" 

 1997 UK version
"You Got the Love" 
"You Got the Love" 

 2006 UK version
"You Got the Love" 
"You Got the Love" 
"You Got the Love" 
"You Got the Love" 
"You Got the Love" 
"You Got the Love" 
Enhanced video

 Australian version
"You Got the Love" 
"You Got the Love" 
"You Got the Love" 
"You Got the Love" 
"You Got the Love" 
"You Got the Love" 
"You Got the Love" 
"You Got the Love" 
"You Got the Love" 
"You Got the Love" 
"You Got the Love" 

 2012 Hungarian version
"You've Got the Love 2k12" 

 2015 official remix
"You Got the Love" 
"You Got the Love"

Charts and certifications

Weekly charts

Year-end charts

Certifications

Release history

Florence and the Machine version

The song was covered by English indie rock band Florence and the Machine as "You've Got the Love" and released as the fifth single from their debut album, Lungs (2009). It was first released on 1 December 2008 as the B-side to their second single "Dog Days Are Over". It was then later released as a digital download only single on 5 January 2009 in the United Kingdom only, after the mass praise it received during the release of "Dog Days Are Over". After being released before Lungs was finally recorded and released, it was later featured on the album as its bonus track.

The single was given a re-release on physical format on 16 November 2009 in the United Kingdom. For the reissue a music video was shot.

Background
The track, which is significantly shorter than the original, was produced by Charlie Hugall, who also produced three other tracks on Lungs. Hugall was also involved in the bass and percussion development of the song. The track features Isabella Summers on piano, Christopher Lloyd Hayden on drums, Tom Moth on harp, Rob Ackroyd on guitar and Florence Welch on vocals.

Florence Welch explained her inspiration behind covering "one of her favourite songs ever":
As a kid, going to clubs and raves, this song made me feel love. At Bestival last year we were top of the bill on that stage, so we were thinking of an amazing cover we could do, and I thought of Candi Staton. Even in rehearsals, playing it was just the most euphoric feeling. Then playing it live and seeing everyone's arms in the air, and the faces – it was the best feeling ever! I was dressed as a genie sea-monster, and I remember looking at my guitarist as we played the first chords, and then there was the reaction and it was like tearing ourselves open and just exploding on the crowd, and then all did it back. It's a feeling you couldn't express. I'm really excited that now in our live shows I'm going to be playing one of my favourite songs ever, loads.

"You've Got the Love" is a fan favourite of the band and has been played at numerous festivals around the United Kingdom during 2008 and 2009. Including the Bestival, Glastonbury, Way Out West, Brighton, Electric Picnic, Leeds, Smash & Grab and with an acoustic version being performed at a festival in Reading. It's also been performed Live In Ibiza on BBC Radio 1 and at the BBC Live Big Weekend. Florence also made a guest appearance during The xx's 2010 Glastonbury Festival performance, where they played their remix of the track. In 2013, a children's choir rendition of the song was used in TV spots for Coca-Cola.

Critical reception
"You've Got the Love" received positive reviews who notably commented on the song in reviews of "Dog Days Are Over". MusicOMH commented on the song by saying that "Following with her tradition of some finely chosen cover versions, there's even an excellent rendition of The Source's You Got the Love." Altsounds.com reviewed the track, writing, "You've Got the Love" is a standard pop number that does something in a non-standard fashion – it isn't afraid of looking at its simplistic melodic hooks and accepting it with a touch of lyrical honesty and contemplative imprint."

Contactmusic.com also commented on the song by saying that "The B-side cover of The Source ft. Candi Staton's "You Got the Love" is equally strong." Dailymusicguide.com also positively reviewed the single, writing, "Florence + The Machine have used the format of the original remix but have certainly breathed new life into this old classic. With Florence Welch's distinctive voice she makes this song her own. The inclusion of a harp only adds to the gentle sway effect produced by the track, bursting gently in without malice at around eighteen seconds in. The song's lyrics are empowering: Florence's heavenly voice has a vulnerable quality which, as it has with relatively short career so far, grows stronger through You've Got The Love's verse and chorus. It's empowering, liberating and moving all at the same time, not least conveyed by the emotion in Welch's vocals. Rating: 4/5"

Commercial performance
Upon its original release, "You've Got the Love" reached number 158 on the UK Singles Chart. The song later re-entered the chart at number 124 and moved up to number 68 in the next week's chart. The following week it fell to number 75 before dropping out of the top 100.

It then re-entered the chart, two weeks later on 22 August 2009 at number 59, where it peaked before dropping out the top 100 again. Its re-entry pattern then continued when it re-entered three weeks later on 12 September 2009 at number 88. The song peaked at number 16, after the single's actual release in 2009. It spent a total of eight weeks within the top 100, longer than both previous singles "Kiss with a Fist" and "Dog Days Are Over".

In November 2009, BBC Sport used the song at the end of the Formula 1 coverage of the 2009 Abu Dhabi Grand Prix (and the whole 2009 season) for a season review video which covered highlights of all 17 races that were held that year.

On 3 January 2010, "You've Got the Love" climbed 18 places to a new peak of number 13 on the UK Singles Chart after its use in the last episode of Gavin & Stacey on 1 January 2010. One week later, on 10 January 2010, the song peaked at number five in its 34th week on the chart, becoming the band's first top-10 single. Following their Brit performance in February 2010, "You've Got the Love" climbed to number 12, just missing out on the Top 10. It has spent 30 weeks on the UK Singles Chart. As of June 2018, the song has sold over 1.8 million combined sales/streams in that country.

On 8 January 2010, "You've Got the Love" climbed up the Irish Singles Chart, reaching a peak of number 21, whereas before it had only reached number 30. After falling out of the chart, on 26 February 2010, "You've Got the Love" re-entered the Irish chart, reaching a new peak of number 16.

In January, "You've got the Love" entered the Australian singles ARIA Charts at number 50, and remained within the top 50 for a large amount of time. In February and March, it was consistently increasing positions, where it eventually reached a peak of number 30. Due to popular television shows like Domestic Blitz and MasterChef Australia using it in commercials, the song rapidly climbed to number 17, on 4 April, and to its highest peak of number nine on 11 April. It hasn't been released as a physical single, and has relied solely on digital sales, where it has peaked at number five.

In New Zealand the single began receiving mainstream radio airplay causing it to rise to 50 on the airplay chart, however, the airplay has since dropped.

Music video
Despite originally being released as a single almost nine months earlier, the band announced on 18 September 2009 that a music video would be made for the song and would be shot on 21 September 2009 in London. It features Welch in a white, sparkly leotard dancing on a large moon-shaped platform suspended over a nightclub, an homage to Studio 54. The video later shows many people beneath her dancing to the song. The video that aired on United Kingdom television has a different version of the song to the one on the album.

Track listings
Original release 
"You've Got the Love" – 2:58

UK CD single
"You've Got the Love" – 2:49
"You've Got the Love"  – 7:51
"Addicted to Love" – 3:20

UK 7" single
"You've Got the Love"  – 2:40
"You've Got the Love"  – 5:36

Digital EP
"You've Got the Love" – 2:48
"You've Got the Love"  – 7:53
"You've Got the Love"  – 6:21
"You've Got the Love"  – 3:45

Charts

Weekly charts

Year-end charts

Certifications

You Got the Dirtee Love

At the 2010 BRIT Awards on 16 February 2010, Florence and the Machine and Dizzee Rascal performed a mashup of "You Got the Love" and Dizzee's song "Dirtee Cash", entitled "You Got the Dirtee Love".

The single was released on 17 February 2010 exclusively to iTunes, one day after the BRITs performance. On 21 February 2010, the single entered the UK Singles Chart at number two. As of May 2010, the single had sold more than 280,000 copies in the UK. "You Got the Dirtee Love" is featured on the Dirtee Deluxe Edition of Dizzee Rascal's Tongue n' Cheek album; the track charted in Ireland and Australia following the album's release. It also appears on the Between Two Lungs reissue of Florence and the Machine's album Lungs.

The song was performed at Radio 1's Big Weekend in North Wales on 22 May 2010, and again at the Glastonbury Festival 2010 on 25 June. The song was also performed at Capital's Summertime Ball 2010, where Florence Welch appeared as a special guest during Dizzee's set.

Charts

Other versions
The song was covered by English singer and songwriter Joss Stone for her fourth studio album, Colour Me Free!, released in October 2008. Sam Ryder released a cover version as a single in 2023.

References

External links
 The Source
 Now Voyager
 Sound on Sound article on the recording and mixing of Florence & The Machine's version
 Video
 Kaisen Records Kaisen Records Link

1986 songs
1986 singles
1991 singles
1997 singles
2006 singles
2009 singles
2010 singles
Dizzee Rascal songs
Positiva Records singles
English house music songs